Neale Fraser defeated Alex Olmedo 6–3, 5–7, 6–2, 6–4 in the final to win the men's singles tennis title at the 1959 U.S. National Championships.

Seeds
The seeded players are listed below. Neale Fraser is the champion; others show the round in which they were eliminated.

 Alex Olmedo (finalist)
 Neale Fraser (champion)
 Barry MacKay (quarterfinals)
 Rod Laver (quarterfinals)
 Ramanathan Krishnan (third round)
 Luis Ayala (quarterfinals)
 Butch Buchholz (fourth round)
 Roy Emerson (quarterfinals)

Draw

Key
 Q = Qualifier
 WC = Wild card
 LL = Lucky loser
 r = Retired

Final eight

Earlier rounds

Section 1

Section 2

Section 3

Section 4

Section 5

Section 6

Section 7

Section 8

References

External links
 1959 U.S. National Championships on ITFtennis.com, the source for this draw
 Association of Tennis Professionals (ATP) – 1959 U.S. Championships Men's Singles draw

Men's Singles
U.S. National Championships (tennis) by year – Men's singles